Chinen is an Okinawan surname. Notable people with the surname include:

Kama Chinen, Japanese supercentenarian
, Japanese footballer
Kaori Chinen, professional Go player
Masami Chinen, Okinawan martial artist and founder of Yamanni ryu
Rina Chinen, Japanese singer
Teruo Chinen, Okinawan martial artist and grandson of Masami Chinen
Yuri Chinen, Japanese singer and actor

Japanese-language surnames
Okinawan surnames